Harold Clifford Edwards  (hon.) (15 August 1899 - 2 August 1989) was a British surgeon. His sons were the geneticists John H. Edwards (1928-2007) and A.W.F. Edwards (1935-). He was awarded a Commander of the Order of the British Empire in 1945.

References 
 http://www.aim25.ac.uk/cgi-bin/vcdf/detail?coll_id=6151&inst_id=6&nv1=search&nv2=
 EDWARDS, Harold Clifford’, Who Was Who, A & C Black, an imprint of Bloomsbury Publishing plc, 1920–2008; online edn, Oxford University Press, Dec 2007 accessed 20 April 2013
 http://www.npg.org.uk/collections/search/person/mp71915/harold-clifford-edwards
 Plarr's Lives of the Fellows

1899 births
1989 deaths
Commanders of the Order of the British Empire
Fellows of the Royal College of Surgeons
Fellows of the Royal College of Obstetricians and Gynaecologists